The Russian Bishop's House, once the Russian Mission Orphanage, is a historic house museum and National Historic Landmark at Lincoln and Monastery Streets in Sitka, Alaska.  Built in 1841–43, this log structure is one of the oldest surviving buildings of Russian America, and was one of the centerpieces of the Russian Orthodox church's efforts to spread its influence among the natives of Alaska.  It was the home and administrative center of Ivan Veniaminov, the first Bishop of Alaska, later canonized as Innocent of Alaska.  The house is now a unit of Sitka National Historical Park, and is administered by the National Park Service.

Description

The exterior has undergone a number of alterations since construction.  The south facade was sheathed in clapboarding c. 1851, and the galleries were roofed in metal around that time.  In 1887 the galleries were sheathed in board-and-batten siding.  The interior was repeatedly altered over the decades, and underwent a major restoration once the property was acquired by the National Park Service 1973.

Secondary buildings
The property on which the Bishop's House stands includes two secondary buildings associated with the activities of the Russian Orthodox Church.  East of the main house stands the Old School, a two-story wood-frame structure built in 1897 to provide a kindergarten and girls' school.  House 105 is a -story wood-frame structure which stands facing Monastery Street.  It was originally on a separate parcel of land, and was apparently moved to its present location in the 1950s.

History
The Russian Bishop's House was built between 1841 and 1843 by Finnish laborers brought in by the Russian American Company, to provide housing for Reverend Ivan Veniaminov, who had been appointed the first Bishop of Alaska by the Russian Orthodox Church.  From his seat in Sitka, Veniaminov oversaw the spread of Orthodox missionary and educational work to the indigenous peoples of southern Alaska, nearly doubling the number of Orthodox worshippers in the region between 1841 and 1860.  Missionary efforts were continued after the United States purchased Alaska in 1867 and were only significantly cut back after funding cuts in the wake of the Russian Revolution in 1917.  The seat of the Russian diocese was relocated to San Francisco in 1872, and the Bishop's House was repurposed to provide housing quarters for priests.  Its first floor also served as an inn for a time.

In 1903 a bishop was once again assigned to a district with its seat at Sitka.  For most of the 20th century, the upper floors housed a chapel and the quarters of the bishop, while the ground floor was used in a variety of ways.  In the 1920s it housed a printing operation that produced, in addition to church publications, the Sitka Sun and the Sitka Tribune.

The Old School was used as a church school building until 1922, and as a public school thereafter.  House 105, while not of architectural note, was used as a church rental property for many years, and is one of the oldest buildings in Sitka.

The property was designated a National Historic Landmark in 1962, and was listed on the National Register of Historic Places as the "Russian Mission Orphanage" in 1966, reflecting its major function at that time.  The National Register designation was altered to "Russian Bishop's House" in 1980.

The Russian Bishop's House is now owned and managed by the National Park Service as a unit of Sitka National Historical Park.  It is open to the public on ranger-guided tours.

See also
List of National Historic Landmarks in Alaska
List of the oldest buildings in Alaska
National Register of Historic Places listings in Sitka City and Borough, Alaska

References

National Historic Landmarks in Alaska
Houses in Sitka, Alaska
Properties of religious function on the National Register of Historic Places in Alaska
Protected areas of Sitka, Alaska
Historic house museums in Alaska
Museums in Sitka, Alaska
Native American museums in Alaska
Protected areas established in 1972
National Park Service areas in Alaska
1972 establishments in Alaska
Houses completed in 1842
Buildings and structures on the National Register of Historic Places in Sitka, Alaska